Tonnoirella is a genus of crane fly in the family Limoniidae.

Distribution
Tasmania, Australia.

Species
T. gemella Alexander, 1928

References

Limoniidae
Diptera of Australasia

nl:Dasymallomyia